Knights of the Abyss are an American deathcore band from Glendale, Arizona, United States, formed in 2005.

Biography
Knights of the Abyss was formed in 2005 after drummer Andy Rysdam had left his former band Job for a Cowboy. They have recorded two full-length albums, which were released by Siege of Amida Records and Ferret Music. Early songs featured the original vocalist Phil Noriega. Dustin Hadlock, a friend of the band who had provided some guest vocals on some older tracks, stepped in to record the rest of the album and toured with the band throughout January 2008. The band announced their signing to Ferret Music. A new song, titled "A New Darkened Faith", from their first Ferret album, Shades, was posted on the band's Myspace page in early April. All vocals on Shades were by Dustin Curtis of the band A Breath Before Surfacing from Tucson, Arizona. The band has toured in the United States and the United Kingdom, playing alongside bands such as Elysia and Arsonists Get All the Girls. Elysia's vocalist, Zak Vargas, was featured on the song "Decaying Waste" from the album Juggernaut.

With the start of 2009, many of the original members of Knights of the Abyss had left, many to return to school. Dustin Hadlock was once again appointed vocalist, and drummer James Gillespie, guitarist Brian McNulty, and bass guitarist Griffin Kolinski were added as well. Kolinski and McNulty also play in the Arizona metal band The Blood Countess. Hadlock and Gillespie were recruited from Nick Florence's side project, entitled Decessus. Florence is currently the only original member of the band. Knights of the Abyss announced that they had returned to the studio to demo and record a follow-up to Shades. On May 3, 2009, the band posted a new song in pre-production dubbed as "Pandemic", as a sign they were recording their newest album. By May 1, 2010, the band had completed recording their third full-length album, titled The Culling of Wolves.

Knights of the Abyss launched the first single for The Culling of Wolves, titled "Deceiver's Creed", on both their Myspace and Facebook pages in July 2010. As stated by their social networking sites, the album was released August 17, 2010 via Ferret Music. They also announced two separate U.S. tours for the fall. "The Culling of Wolves Tour" featured Conducting from the Grave, Enfold Darkness, and The World We Knew. "The California Blood Tour" included Cattle Decapitation, Devourment, Burning the Masses, and Son of Aurelius.

Former band member, Griffin Kolinski, died on July 20, 2015, aged 28, from congestive heart failure.

The band reunited in 2022 with them teasing a new single Entreched in Stench.

In October 2022, original and former drummer Andy Rysdam returned to the band.

Band members

Current members
 Nick Florence – guitar (2005–2012, 2015, 2022–present)
 Andy Rysdam – drums (2005–2008, 2022–present)
 Cody Brechtel – guitar (2008–2009, 2022–present)
 Cameron Martin – vocals (2022–present)
 Gabe Santillan – bass (2022–present)

Former members
 J.M. Campbell – bass (2005–2006)
 Phil Noriega – vocals (2005–2006)
 John Seabury – bass (2006–2007)
 Mike Mannheimer – vocals (2006–2007, 2008–2009)
 Aaron Stone – bass, vocals (2007–2008)
 Dustin Hadlock – vocals (2007–2008, 2009–2010)
 Peter Ridegway – touring keyboards (2008–2009)
 Griffin " The Father" Kolinski – bass (2009–2012);(died 2015)
 Ben Harclerode – drums (2009–2010)
 James Gillespie – drums (2009)
 Mark Brice – touring vocals (2009)
 Logan Paul "Harley Magnum" Kavanaugh – vocals (2010–2012, 2015)
 Brian McNulty – guitar (2009–2012, 2015)
 Mark Gray – drums (2022)

Timeline

Discography

Studio albums
 Juggernaut (2007)
 Shades (2008)
 The Culling of Wolves (2010)

Other releases
 Decapitation of the Dark Ages (EP, 2005)
 Demo 2006
 Entrenched in Stench (Single, 2022)

References

External links
 Knights of the Abyss on Myspace

Musical groups established in 2005
2005 establishments in Arizona
Heavy metal musical groups from Arizona
Musicians from Glendale, Arizona
American deathcore musical groups
Ferret Music artists
Metalcore musical groups from Arizona